Turn It On Again: The Tour was a 2007 concert tour of Europe and North America by the English rock band Genesis. The tour was notable for the return of drummer and vocalist Phil Collins, who had fronted the band during their most commercially successful period before leaving in 1996, rejoining founder members Tony Banks and Mike Rutherford, with their traditional on-stage musicians, Chester Thompson on drums and  Daryl Stuermer on guitar/bass.

History
Collins was initially reported by the BBC as being interested in a reunion in November 2005. Collins had said he was "open" to a reunion featuring original lead singer Peter Gabriel where he would just be playing drums. After much speculation regarding a reunion, Tony Banks, Phil Collins and Mike Rutherford announced the tour on 7 November 2006, nearly 40 years after the band had first formed. Collins insisted it would be more of a "selection of shows" rather than a tour. Group manager Tony Smith was also on hand for the announcement, which was introduced by popular comedian and Genesis fan David Baddiel.

Originally, Collins, Banks and Rutherford wanted to reunite as a quintet with Peter Gabriel and Steve Hackett, for live performances of The Lamb Lies Down on Broadway. Gabriel had reportedly agreed in principle to perform, and as such Steve Hackett was also contacted, but as time went on, Gabriel could not commit to a date. "Peter is a little over-cautious about going back to something which fundamentally is fun", Collins said. Once Gabriel declined, Hackett's participation became moot, and the decision was made to proceed as the three piece. A short note expressing Hackett's good wishes for the reunion tour was placed on his website. In their stead, both Daryl Stuermer and Chester Thompson returned as supplementary on-stage musicians.

The band embarked on the first leg of the tour in Europe. The stage set was designed by Mark Fisher with lighting design by Patrick Woodroffe. The routing took in twelve countries beginning in Helsinki, Finland on 11 June 2007 and ending in Rome, Italy on 14 July 2007. The Rome show was a free concert for an audience of 500,000. This leg of the tour was documented in the film Come Rain or Shine, released as part of the three-DVD set When in Rome in 2008. The documentary shows the rather difficult conditions the band faced during the first leg, with rain hampering all but a handful of the shows during this portion of the tour. On the Paris and Amsterdam shows, the band was also accompanied by a La7/MTV crew, whose documentary, Genesis On the Road, aired on Italian TV before the Rome show.

The band held a press conference in New York City on 7 March 2007 at noon EST to announce the details of the North American leg of the Turn It On Again reunion tour. This leg commenced on 7 September 2007 in Toronto, Ontario, Canada at BMO Field and ended on 13 October 2007 at the Hollywood Bowl in Los Angeles, California. It was announced on 1 June that Genesis would be working with the Encore Series team at TheMusic.com to record each show of their European tour (and also done for their subsequent North American tour) for release as a 2-CD set (similar to the series done for the Who and Peter Gabriel). All shows were recorded directly off the soundboard and were previously available for either individual sale or as a complete box set of the entire tour.

The CD Live Over Europe 2007 was released on 20 November 2007 in North America and 26 November 2007, in the UK. The When in Rome 2007 triple-DVD set was released 26 May 2008 (10 June 2008 for North America) and featured the complete free concert filmed in Rome, Italy on 14 July 2007. The set also contains the documentary Come Rain or Shine which was broadcast in a selection of cinemas in the UK and Europe on 20 May 2008. The 27 June concert in Düsseldorf was broadcast live in HD and Dolby 5.1 Surround to cinemas in the UK, Spain and Sweden. Most of the tour was recorded directly from the soundboard and released in collaboration with the band by the Encore Music series and TheMusic.com.

The tour was notable as being the first time nearly every song was performed in a lower key to compensate for the weakening of Collins's voice. Only "Hold on My Heart", "Follow You Follow Me" and all instrumentals were performed in the same key as their original studio recordings. Clips of Collins attempting to reach higher notes during rehearsals for "The Cinema Show" and "In Too Deep" appear in Come Rain or Shine. An additional clip from an October 2006 rehearsal in New York City shows the band discussing the key change for "Mama", with Collins referencing Elton John and his need to sing older songs in a much lower register than originally recorded. Collins added that Paul McCartney continues to sing all his songs in their original key, despite not being able to properly sing many of the higher notes.

Set list

During the initial London press conference, it was revealed that music dating back as far as 1973 would be performed on the tour, with the songs "Domino", "Afterglow", "In the Cage" and "Los Endos" cited as probable inclusions in the set. Rehearsal footage screened at the conference also showed the band working on "No Son of Mine" and "Home by the Sea". It was confirmed that no material from the post-Collins album Calling All Stations would be performed, and that the group were not planning on playing their 1972 epic "Supper's Ready". It later evolved that a small piece of "Stagnation", from the pre-Collins album Trespass would be included as part of the "Firth of Fifth/I Know What I Like" medley (as it has been since their 1977 tour).

Further details were uncovered whilst Genesis were rehearsing in Cossonay, Switzerland, throughout April and May 2007, when fan recordings began surfacing on the internet. These recordings revealed the band to be working on a number of older songs, including "Behind the Lines", 
"I Know What I Like (In Your Wardrobe)",
"The Carpet Crawlers"
and "Follow You Follow Me",
as well as latter-day singles "Invisible Touch",
"I Can't Dance"
and "Throwing It All Away".

In an interview with Tony Banks and Mike Rutherford, it was confirmed that both "Jesus He Knows Me" from We Can't Dance and "Abacab" from Abacab were rehearsed though neither song was performed.

The complete set list was revealed following production rehearsals in Brussels, Belgium.
This set remained unchanged throughout the European leg of the tour:

Main set

"Duke's Intro" ("Behind the Lines/"Duke's End")/"Turn It On Again"
"No Son of Mine"
"Land of Confusion"
"In the Cage"/"The Cinema Show" /"Duke's Travels"/"Afterglow 
"Hold on My Heart"
"Home by the Sea"/"Second Home by the Sea"
"Follow You Follow Me"
"Firth of Fifth" /"I Know What I Like (In Your Wardrobe)"
"Mama" 
"Ripples..."
"Throwing It All Away" 
"Domino" 
"Conversations with Two Stools" 
"Los Endos"
"Tonight, Tonight, Tonight" /Invisible Touch
 "I Can't Dance" [ENCORE]
 "The Carpet Crawlers" [ENCORE]

An identical setlist was performed on the North American leg of the tour, with the band's producer, Nick Davis, stating that no changes are planned. Tony Banks had earlier cited "In Too Deep" from Invisible Touch as a likely addition to the North American set, possibly at the expense of "Ripples" from A Trick of the Tail, but that change was not made. The only exception to the setlist was on 12 October at the Hollywood Bowl, where the last two songs had to be dropped due to the heavy rain causing problems with Tony Banks's keyboards.

At the beginning of the drum duet Thompson and Collins begin drumming either side of two barstools. This idea evolved from when Collins was interviewed during the Way We Walk tour about how the duets are constructed. He said: "A lot of the patterns evolve through the tour, so the duet at the end of the tour is much longer than the one at the beginning. But initially me and Chester sit either side of a chair and drum out beats until something sticks."

Tour band
 Tony Banks – keyboards, moog taurus, backing vocals, sound effects
 Mike Rutherford – guitar, bass, bass pedals, backing vocals
 Phil Collins – lead vocals, drums, percussion

Additional musicians 
 Daryl Stuermer – bass, guitar, backing vocals
 Chester Thompson – drums, percussion

Tour dates

See also 
 List of highest-grossing concert tours

References

2007 concert tours
Genesis (band) concert tours
Reunion concert tours